This is a list of theatrical animated feature films produced or released by The Weinstein Company.

Films

US releases

International releases

Highest-grossing films

Notes

See also
 List of The Weinstein Company films

References 

American animated films

The Weinstein Company films
Lists of American animated films